Dr. Hemang Dixit (born 11 June 1937) is a Nepalese educationalist, author, and consultant paediatrician. In addition to his real name, he also uses the pseudonyms Mani Acharya and Mani Dixit for his written works.  He is currently the Principal of Kathmandu Medical College. In the past, he had worked as the Dean and Professor of Child Health of Tribhuvan University Institute of Medicine . He has written various medical textbooks, novels, children’s books and poems.

Dixit's novel Shatru of Kathmandu was published in October 2011. Though a work of fiction, the author used the experience of his attempted murder by extortionists as a starting point for the story.

Professional Role
He graduated in Medicine from Charing Cross Hospital Medical School, London University. He has worked at Bir Hospital and Kanti Children’s Hospital.

He has been a member of Nepal Medical Council for over two decades and has been its Vice Chairman for two terms.

He is a member of various associations, including Nepal Medical Association, Nepal Paediatric Society, Nepal Leprosy Relief Association, Nepal Red Cross . He has been the Vice President (1970-71 & 1974-75) and President (1991–92) of Nepal Medical Association. He has been the Vice President (1984–85) and President (1986–87) of Member of Nepal Paediatric Society.

He is also a member of Literary Association Nepal (LAN).

Publications
All of Dixit's works, aside from his technical writings, are under the pseudonym "Mani Dixit".

Technical books
Nepal’s Quest for Health, 3rd Edition, Educational Publishing House, 
50 Years of NMA
My 2 Innings (Memoirs), 2nd Edition, Makalu Publication House
A Concise History of Medicine, Makalu Publication House

Novels
Shatru of Kathmandu, Educational Publishing House.
The Red Temple, 2nd Revised Edition Pilgrims Book House
Come Tomorrow, 2nd Edition Adarsh Books, India
Over the mountains, Ekta Books
Conflict in the Himalayas, Ekta Books

Children’s Books
The Adventure of Chandra and Damaru-Two Boys of Nepal, 2nd Revised Edition, Pilgrims Book
House Friends Colony, 2nd Editions, Rupa & Co., India
Happenings in Shangri-La, 2nd Edition, Millennium Publication

Poetry
The Avenging Ghost, 
Nonsense Verses from Nepal, Adarsh Books, India

Other
Reflections Down the Ages (2019), as Hemang Mani Dixit

References

External links
 Official site

1937 births
Living people
Nepalese male poets
Nepalese male novelists